Carmen Haid (born 1974) is an Austrian fashion industry entrepreneur and the founder of Atelier-Mayer.com.

Education 

Haid received her education at London College of Fashion (BA HONS Fashion Management).

Career 

In 1997 - 2008 Carmen was employed as an in-house communications executive at Yves Saint Laurent Céline and Tommy Hilfiger with a stint at Vogue in 2001.

In 2008 she and Alice Kodell launched Atelier-Mayer.com, a website for vintage luxury fashion and accessories, in collaboration with designers Rafael Lopez, Katherine Alexander and Abbie Walsh. The company shut down in 2015.

In 2009 she was nominated for the Entrepreneur of the Year, Grazia 02 Awards, for Best Design, Veranda Awards USA, and for Best Vintage Website for the first online Fashion Awards,  Handbag.com.

In 2010 she was named as Best Emerging Brand and Retailer for the WGSN Global Fashion Awards.

In 2011 she won the Future 100 Awards, as well as the Wallpaper Design Award for Best Hotel Service.

In 2011 Haid launched a bi-annual limited edition print publication as well as a supplement to Vanity Fair that is stocked in London, Paris and Beirut.

Books 

The Fashion Handbook by Tim Jackson & David Shaw, 2006
Jackson, Tim and Haid, Carmen (2002) Gucci Group: The New family of Luxury Brands, A Case Study. International Journal of New Product Development and Innovation Management, 4 (2). pp. 161–172. 
Contemporary Fashion Stylists by Luanne Mclean, Sep 2012

References

External links
The Hill Resident – December 2011 digital edition

1974 births
Living people